Dengkou County, is a county with  inhabitants (2020) under the administration of Baynnur, in the west of Inner Mongolia.

Climate

References

County-level divisions of Inner Mongolia
Bayannur